The 1975–76 St. Louis Blues season was the ninth for the franchise in St. Louis, Missouri.  The Blues finished the regular-season with a record of 29 wins, 37 losses and 14 ties, good for 72 points.  Because of their third-place finish in the Smythe Division, the Blues qualified for the playoffs for the second consecutive year, only to lose the Buffalo Sabres, 2–1 in the Preliminary Round.

Offseason

Regular season

Final standings

Schedule and results

Playoffs

Player statistics

Regular season
Scoring

Goaltending

Playoffs
Scoring

Goaltending

Awards and records

Transactions

Draft picks
St. Louis's draft picks at the 1975 NHL Amateur Draft held in Montreal, Quebec.

Farm teams

See also
1975–76 NHL season

References

External links

St. Louis Blues seasons
St. Louis
St. Louis
St Louis
St Louis